Force Majeure is the ninth studio album by the German group Tangerine Dream. It was originally issued on transparent vinyl. Following Stratosfear, the album developed Tangerine Dream's further evolution toward the more melodic sound they would adopt in the 1980s, with a heavier presence of guitars, drums and distinct musical suites in the  tradition of progressive rock, rather than the band's 1970s output of Berlin School.

The distortion of the bass sequence on "Thru Metamorphic Rocks" was the result of a burnt-out transistor in the mixing desk. When the band heard the result, they decided to keep it.

Force Majeure is Tangerine Dream's fourth-biggest-selling album in the UK, reaching No. 26 and spending 7 weeks on the chart.

Monique Froese's rear cover artwork collage includes an image of a man's lower face, apparently a photograph of a sculpture, which looks extremely like classical composer Ludwig van Beethoven. His musical influence (heard particularly in some of the harmonic and melodic progressions in Tangerine Dream's music) may possibly be the 'force majeure' to which the album title refers.

Use in other media
Remixed excerpts of "Force Majeure" and "Cloudburst Flight" titled "Lana" and "Guido The Killer Pimp" respectively, were used on the film soundtrack of Risky Business while a remixed excerpt of "Thru Metamorphic Rocks" titled "Igneous" was used on the film Thief. A heavily remixed version was played live in 2003, and later released as "Meta Morph Magic" on the DM 4 album. In 1991, Christopher Franke played "Cloudburst Flight" as part of his solo London Concert.

Track listing

A 2019 CD version, re-mastered from the original master tapes, includes a 1979 Christopher Franke solo recording, 'Chimes and Chains', as a bonus track.

Personnel
Tangerine Dream
 Edgar Froese – keyboards, electric and acoustic guitars, effects
 Christopher Franke – keyboards, sequencers
 Klaus Krüger – drums, percussion
Guest
 Eduard Meyer – cello

Production
 Produced and mixed – Christopher Franke, Edgar Froese
 Engineered – Eduard Meyer
 Painting and cover design – Monica Froese.

Charts

References

1979 albums
Tangerine Dream albums
Virgin Records albums